A Racing Romeo is a 1927 American comedy film directed by Sam Wood and written by Byron Morgan. The film stars Red Grange, Jobyna Ralston, Trixie Friganza, Walter Hiers, Ben Hendricks Jr. and Warren Rogers. The film was released on September 1, 1927, by Film Booking Offices of America.

Plot
Red Walden (Grange) and his friend Sparks (Hiers) are co-owners of a garage that is struggling financially. Trying to figure out how to save their business, the two decide to enter the Big Race, a cross-country event that promised a large prize money for the winner.

Cast
Red Grange as Red Walden
Jobyna Ralston as Sally
Trixie Friganza as Aunt Hattie
Walter Hiers as Sparks
Ben Hendricks Jr. as Rube Oldham
Warren Rogers as Silas
Ashton Dearholt as Motion Picture Director
Marjorie Zier as Leading Lady

Production
Director Sam Wood and writer Byron Morgan, who had previous success with motorsports films, approached American football star Red Grange about developing a movie during the football offseason. Interested in driving race cars, Grange accepted.

The film was shot at the fairgrounds in Ventura, California over five weeks. Although Grange wanted to perform the racing scenes himself, the crew hired Cliff Bergere as his stunt performer, with Grange doing the driving for close-up shots. Racers Freddie Frame, Babe Stapp, and Lou Moore also participated in production.

Reception
A Racing Romeo struggled at the box office, which Grange speculated was due to poor promotion.

References

Further reading

External links
 

1927 films
1920s English-language films
Silent American comedy films
1927 comedy films
American auto racing films
Film Booking Offices of America films
Films directed by Sam Wood
American silent feature films
American black-and-white films
1920s American films